Gerry Whiting Hazelton (February 24, 1829 – September 29, 1920) was an American lawyer and Republican politician.  He represented Wisconsin's 2nd congressional district in the 42nd and 43rd Congresses.  He also served nine years as United States Attorney for the Eastern District of Wisconsin, and two years as a member of the Wisconsin State Senate, representing Columbia County.

Early life
Born in Chester, Rockingham County, New Hampshire, he attended the common schools and Pinkerton Academy in Derry, New Hampshire, and he received instruction from a private tutor. He studied law and was admitted to the bar in Amsterdam, New York, in 1852.

Career
Hazelton moved to Columbus, Wisconsin, in 1860, where he served in the Wisconsin State Senate in 1861 and 1862, and was chosen as president pro tempore in the special session of 1862. He was a delegate to the 1860 Republican National Convention and became district attorney for Columbia County, Wisconsin in 1865. He was then appointed collector of internal revenue for the second district of Wisconsin in 1866 and removed by President Johnson the same year.

Elected to the House of Representatives in the Forty-second and Forty-third United States Congresses Hazelton was United States Representative for Wisconsin's 2nd congressional district (March 4, 1871 – March 3, 1875).  After he served his terms, he moved to Milwaukee and became the United States attorney for the western district of Wisconsin. He later was appointed special master in chancery in 1912 and was the United States court commissioner and commissioner for Milwaukee County for many years.

Death
Hazelton died in Milwaukee on September 29, 1920 (age 91 years, 218 days). He is interred at Forest Home Cemetery, Milwaukee, Wisconsin.

Family
The son of William and Mercy Jane Hazelton, he married Martha L. Squire in 1854 and they had a daughter, Anna. His brother, George Cochrane Hazelton, was also a representative from Wisconsin. His uncle (his mother's brother), Clark B. Cochrane, was a congressman from New York.

See also
 List of United States attorneys for Wisconsin

References

External links

1829 births
1920 deaths
Republican Party Wisconsin state senators
People from Chester, New Hampshire
People from Columbus, Wisconsin
Pinkerton Academy alumni
Republican Party members of the United States House of Representatives from Wisconsin
United States Attorneys for the Eastern District of Wisconsin